Ahmad ibn Tawoos, also known as "Tawoos" or "al-Taus" (died 673), was one of the Tabi‘in, and one of the narrators of hadith.

References

Tabi‘un
Tabi‘un hadith narrators
673 deaths
Year of birth unknown
7th-century Arabs